Florin Vlad (born 14 September 1980) is a Romanian weightlifter. He competed in the men's heavyweight event at the 2000 Summer Olympics.

References

External links
 

1980 births
Living people
Romanian male weightlifters
Olympic weightlifters of Romania
Weightlifters at the 2000 Summer Olympics
Sportspeople from Constanța